Lists of college soccer programs cover college soccer programs organized by the National Collegiate Athletic Association (NCAA) in the United States. They are divided into divisional lists.

Lists
List of NCAA Division I men's soccer programs
List of NCAA Division II men's soccer programs
List of NCAA Division I women's soccer programs
List of NCAA Division II women's soccer programs